The Church of the Holy Apostles Rectory is an historic Carpenter Gothic house located at 1700 Hagood Avenue in Barnwell, South Carolina, On April 13, 1972, it was added to the National Register of Historic Places. It is also known as the Roberts House, the Old Patterson House, or The Rectory.

History
The Rev. Edwin Wagner, first rector of the Church of the Holy Apostles, had this house built before 1857 on land that he owned. He deeded part of the land adjacent to his house to the church for the erection of a church and cemetery. The house, though, remained in separate ownership from the church until recently. Later owners include James T. Aldrich and Dr. Angus Bethune Patterson, who both served in the South Carolina General Assembly.

See also

List of Registered Historic Places in South Carolina

References

External links
 National Register listings for Barnwell County
 Church of the Holy Apostles website
 Church of the Holy Apostles history
 South Carolina Department of Archives and History file on Church of the Holy Apostles Rectory

Properties of religious function on the National Register of Historic Places in South Carolina
Carpenter Gothic church buildings in South Carolina
Buildings and structures in Barnwell County, South Carolina
Carpenter Gothic houses in the United States
National Register of Historic Places in Barnwell County, South Carolina